The Monte-Carlo Bay Hotel & Resort is a resort located in the neighborhood of Larvotto, Monaco. The hotel is part of the Société des bains de mer de Monaco.

History 

Monte-Carlo Bay Hotel & Resort opened in 2006.

In April 2018, the hotel introduced a Rafael Nadal suite on the tenth floor of the hotel. In August 2018, the hotel officially switched to solar energy.

Description 

Overlooking the Mediterranean Sea, the 10-floor, 334-room Monte-Carlo Bay Hotel & Resort is part of the elite hotels in Monaco with the Hôtel de Paris Monte-Carlo, the Hôtel Hermitage Monte-Carlo and Monte-Carlo Beach. The indoor-outdoor swimming pool runs along the 5-acre garden and takes swimmers to a sandy-bottomed lagoon at the tip of the promontory.

During the summer, tourists from the Middle East make up 10% of the hotel's clientele.

The resort hosted the Rolex Monte-Carlo Masters tennis competition.

Awards 
 2019: Villegiature award for "Best Hotel Pool in Europe"

See also 
 Société des bains de mer de Monaco
 Monte Carlo

References

External links 
 

Hotels in Monaco
Palaces in Monaco
1929 establishments in Monaco
Hotels established in 2006